Henry Barron may refer to:

Sir Henry Barron, 1st Baronet (1795–1872), British MP for Waterford City
Sir Henry Barron, 2nd Baronet (1824–1900), British diplomat and Minister-Resident to Wurttemberg, of the Barron baronets
Henry D. Barron (1833–1882), United States politician in Wisconsin
Henry Barron (judge) (1928–2010), judge at the Irish Supreme Court

See also
Harry Barron (1847–1921), Australian politician
Barron (disambiguation)